Jeremias van Rensselaer (March 18, 1705 – 1745) was the eldest son of Kiliaen van Rensselaer and Maria van Cortlandt.

Manor of Rensselaerwyck
He was the sixth patroon of Rensselaerwyck from 1726 to 1745.  He was also the third Lord of Rensselaerwyck.

Jeremias came of legal age in 1726, and was made Patroon, or third Lord of the Manor, and represented the Manor in the assembly from September, 1726, to September, 1743.

He was succeeded as Lord of Rensselaerwyck by his brother Stephen van Rensselaer, seventh patroon and fourth Lord of Rensselaerwyck.

Personal life
He died unmarried and had no children.

See also
Van Rensselaer family

References

1705 births
1743 deaths
American people of Dutch descent
Jeremias
New Netherland
Members of the New York General Assembly
18th-century American politicians